Robert de Ho (c. 1140-1210) was a twelfth century writer of Anglo-Norman literature known for Enseignements Trebor. Trebor is Robert spelled backward and was for his son.

References 

12th-century English poets
Norman-language poets